Ludwik Stanisław Dorn (5 June 1954 – 7 April 2022) was a Polish conservative politician, who served as Deputy Prime Minister and member of Sejm elected on 5 November 2007.

Biography
Dorn was born Ludwik Dornbaum, to Polish-Jewish parents Henryk Dornbaum, a socialist activist and Alina née Kugler, a doctor. All of his father's family was murdered during the Holocaust. 

In the 1960s Dornbaum family changed their name to Dorn. He was raised agnostic, but he converted to Roman Catholicism at the age of 51. Dorn graduated with a degree in sociology from Warsaw University in 1978.

From 31 October 2005 to 7 February 2007 he was Minister of Interior and Administration, resigned after conflict with the Prime Minister Jarosław Kaczyński. Elected a Marshal of the Sejm on 27 April 2007, with 235 votes, after Marek Jurek's resignation.

On 4 November 2011, he, along with 15 other supporters of the dismissed PiS MEP Zbigniew Ziobro, left Law and Justice on ideological grounds to form a breakaway group, United Poland.

References

External links
 Official website
 Sejm page
 Ludwik Dorn in the Wprost debatase
 Ludwik Dorn in the Polish government website

1954 births
2022 deaths
Converts to Roman Catholicism from atheism or agnosticism
Deputy Prime Ministers of Poland
Interior ministers of Poland
Marshals of the Sejm of the Third Polish Republic
Members of the Polish Sejm 1997–2001
Members of the Polish Sejm 2001–2005
Members of the Polish Sejm 2005–2007
Politicians from Warsaw
Polish sociologists
Jewish Polish politicians
Solidarity (Polish trade union) activists
United Poland politicians
University of Warsaw alumni
Writers from Warsaw
Members of the Polish Sejm 2007–2011
Members of the Polish Sejm 2011–2015